Private Violence is a 2014 American documentary film directed and produced by Cynthia Hill. The film focuses on the issue of domestic violence, as told through two survivors. Ultimately, the film centers on dispelling the logic of the commonly asked question: “Why didn’t she just leave?”

Private Violence premiered in the U.S. Documentary Competition program at the 2014 Sundance Film Festival on January 19, 2014, where it won the Candescent Award. The film was also shown at Full Frame Documentary Film Festival, True/False Film Festival, Dallas International Film Festival, HotDocs Film Festival, and the Doxa Documentary Film Festival. It won the Kathleen Bryan Edwards Award for Human Rights at Full Frame and the Silver Heart Award at the Dallas International Film Festival.

On July 16, 2015, the film was nominated for a Primetime Emmy Award in the Outstanding Information Programing – Long Form category. HBO Documentary Films first broadcast Private Violence on October 20, 2014. HBO films and Women Make Movies are both distributors.

Synopsis
The film narrates the story of domestic violence survivors: Kit Gruelle, a domestic violence victim turned advocate who seeks justice for all female violence survivors, and Deanna Walters, whose estranged husband Robbie kidnapped and beat her for four days in the cab of his truck but was not arrested for it.

Reception
The film received mostly positive response from critics. In his review for Variety, Dennis Harvey said that "Cynthia Hill delivers a vivid portrait of one leading justice advocate and one survivor of horrific spousal abuse." David Rooney of The Hollywood Reporter gave the film a positive review and said that "Cynthia Hill's Private Violence offers an interesting procedural account and, along the way, gets to know the impressively dedicated advocate, Kit Gruelle, who sees it through to the end." Brian Tallerico from Film Threat said, "Just by being truthful and honest with its subjects, Cynthia Hill's film feels like a call to action. Listen to it."

Matt Zoller Zeitz of Vulture called "Private Violence" "difficult to experience, essential to watch." Seitz compares "Private Violence" to other documentaries about domestic violence, stating that "None can touch the power, sensitivity, and explanatory skill of this one. It's not just wallowing in pain, it's illuminating the social architecture that encloses and protects abusers and preserves the status quo." Bill Moyer's included it among the 10 great social justice documentary films of 2014: "The domestic abuse relationship is so uniquely tragic because it happens behind closed doors where it abides by its own twisted rules and illogic. In director Cynthia Hill’s Private Violence, there’s hope in dismantling that terror. The film is a disturbing and bold depiction of a social issue that necessitates the abuse be so bad that help may no longer be relevant. Thankfully, as told here, there are advocates and women courageous enough to fight back so that healing can take hold."

Impact
At the end of 2014, the Governor of South Carolina, Nikki Haley, watched Private Violence on HBO and reached out to film subject Kit Gruelle. The film provided incentive for Governor Haley to coordinate a screening for all of the legislators in her state. She was alarmed to discover that South Carolina had consistently been in the top five for domestic violence-related homicides. Legislatively, almost all domestic violence offenses in her state were classified as misdemeanors. It did not make sense that these same perpetrators of “misdemeanors” were also killing women at alarming rates. Governor Haley started moving forward: she brought Kit Gruelle down to do a screening of the film in front of the entire state legislature. She retained Kit as her domestic violence advisor. Based on those conversations, a task force of representatives from 38 agencies that interface with survivors and their children around the state was formed, and tougher legislation has now been passed in the state with one of the highest domestic violence homicide rates in the nation. “Think about your daughters, think about your sisters, think about your mother, think about the 10 million children every day (nationwide) that see abuse in their families – what are we doing for them?” Haley asked.

Accolades
It received a 2015 Emmy nomination for "Outstanding Informational Programming."

References

External links
Official website

2014 films
2014 documentary films
American documentary films
Films about domestic violence
HBO documentary films
Documentary films about violence against women
2010s English-language films
2010s American films